The Crown is the seventeenth studio album by American rapper Z-Ro. It was released on June 23, 2014 through Rap-A-Lot Records/J. Prince Entertainment with distribution via RED. Recording sessions took place at King of the Ghetto Studio in Houston. Production was handled solely by Leroy "Mr. Lee" Williams, who also served as executive producer with J. Prince and King Shaun. The album features guest appearances from Chris Ward, Kez, King Shaun and Billy Brasco.

Track listing

Personnel
Joseph Wayne McVey IV – primary artist, songwriter
Chris Ward – featured artist & songwriter (track 2)
Kez Jones – featured artist & songwriter (track 3)
"King" Shaun Morrow – featured artist & songwriter (track 12), executive producer
W. "Billy Brasco" Brown – featured artist & songwriter (track 13)
Leroy Williams, Jr. – producer, songwriter, executive producer, mixing (tracks: 1-11, 13-15), mastering
James A. Smith – executive producer
Joshua David Moore – mixing, mastering
Kevin "Supa K" Miles – mixing (tracks: 1-11, 13-15), A&R
Matt Kennedy – mixing (track 14)
Tony "Big Chief" Randle – A&R
Anzel "Int'l Red" Jennings – A&R
Chris Hall – production coordinator
Danielgotskillz – artwork
Mike Mack – marketing and promotions director
Alvin "Short Dog" Stafford – marketing and promotions director

References

2014 albums
Z-Ro albums